George F. Smith (born April 23, 1948) is an American football coach. He began as an assistant coach at St. Thomas Aquinas High School in Fort Lauderdale, Florida in 1972. He was named head coach in 1975 and in 34 years accumulated 361 wins and 6 state championships.

References

1948 births
Living people
High school football coaches in Florida
Sportspeople from Lafayette, Indiana
Purdue University alumni
Coaches of American football from Florida